Manning Community School District was a school district headquartered in Manning, Iowa. The district had  of area.

History

The district had 563 students in the 1995–1996 school year. In the 2004–2005 school year it had 511 students.

In fall 2008 the Manning district and the IKM Community School District began whole grade-sharing, in which one district sent its students to another district's school for the whole day. This arrangement meant that the two districts consolidated their students into each other's schools.

On July 1, 2011, it merged with the IKM district to form the IKM–Manning Community School District. The merger vote, held on Tuesday April 6, 2010, was in favor of consolidation: the vote tally at the Manning poll station was 477–20; the tallies in Irwin and Manilla, respectively, were 206-26 and 190–20.

References

External links

Defunct school districts in Iowa
2011 disestablishments in Iowa
School districts disestablished in 2011